The 2019 Connacht Senior Football Championship is the 120th installment of the annual Connacht Senior Football Championship organised by Connacht GAA. It is one of the four provincial competitions of the 2019 All-Ireland Senior Football Championship. As of 2018 the competition winners advanced to the "All-Ireland Super 8s".

The draw for the Connacht Championship was made on 12 October 2018.

The winners receive the J. J. Nestor Cup, named after J. J. Nestor of Quinaltagh, County Galway. For a fourth year in a row, the final was contested between Galway and Roscommon. Roscommon were the winners of the championship, defeating Galway at Pearse Stadium in Salthill by 1-13 to 0-12.
In 2020 Sligo skipped the championship due to Covid-19 meaning it could be London and New York skipped both 2020 and 2021 seasons are back in 2022.

Teams
The Connacht championship is contested by the five counties in the Irish province of Connacht plus London and New York.

Bracket

The Connacht county teams play London and New York on a rotational basis. The match involving New York was a quarter-final in 2019 – it was last a preliminary game in 2017.

Final

See also
 2019 All-Ireland Senior Football Championship
 2019 Leinster Senior Football Championship
 2019 Munster Senior Football Championship
 2019 Ulster Senior Football Championship

References

External links
 Connacht GAA website

2C
Connacht Senior Football Championship